The slender snipe eel (Nemichthys scolopaceus), also known as the deep sea duck, is a fish that can weigh only a few ounces, yet reach 5 feet or 1.5 m in length. Features include a bird-like beak with curving tips, covered with tiny hooked teeth, which they use to sweep through the water to catch shrimp and other crustaceans. It has a lifespan of ten years.

It has more vertebrae in its backbone than any other animal, around 750. However, its anus has moved forward during its evolution and is now located on its throat. Its larvae are shaped like leaves, which actually get smaller before transforming into adults.

Many specimens found in museums were spat up from larger fish that were caught in trawls.
This organism is found at 2,000 meters in the North Atlantic. They have more than 700 vertebrae which is many more than most other animals. Their reproduction is done by spawning, which is when females lay the eggs and the males lay their sperm into the water at the same time. The slender snipe eel only spawns once in their lifetime as they die after spawning. It is difficult for scientists to research these organisms because of the extreme environment they inhabit. In addition, the conservation status of the slender snipe eel is not well known.

References

Feagans-Bartow, J. (2014). Ecology of the oceanic rim: pelagic eels as key ecosystem components. Marine Ecology Progress Series, 502, 257–266. https://doi.org/10.3354/meps10707

External links

 
 
 Monterey Bay aquarium about Slender snipe eel
 Tim Flannery and Peter Schouten, Astonishing Animals: Extraordinary Creatures and the Fantastic Worlds They Inhabit. New York: Atlantic Monthly Press, 2004. Page 181.

slender snipe eel
Taxa named by John Richardson (naturalist)
Cosmopolitan fish
slender snipe eel